David Buckingham is a Canadian politician, who was elected to the Legislative Assembly of Saskatchewan in the 2016 provincial election.

He represents the electoral district of Saskatoon Westview as a member of the Saskatchewan Party.

In his election he defeated Cam Broten, leader of the Saskatchewan New Democratic Party.

Buckingham previously served as the mayor of Borden, Saskatchewan for two terms, prior to his entry in provincial politics.

Election results

References

Living people
Saskatchewan Party MLAs
Politicians from Saskatoon
21st-century Canadian politicians
Year of birth missing (living people)